Minimisation or minimization may refer to:
 Minimisation (psychology), downplaying the significance of an event or emotion
 Minimisation (clinical trials)
 Minimisation (code) or Minification, removing unnecessary characters from source code
 Structural risk minimization
 Boolean minimization, a technique for optimizing combinational digital circuits
 Cost-minimization analysis, in pharmacoeconomics
 Expenditure minimization problem, in microeconomics
 Waste minimisation
 Harm reduction
 Maxima and minima, in mathematical analysis
 Minimal element of a partial order, in mathematics
 Minimax approximation algorithm
 Minimisation operator ("μ operator"), the add-on to primitive recursion to obtain μ-recursive functions in computer science

See also
Optimization (mathematics)
Minimal (disambiguation)
Minimalism (disambiguation)
Minification (disambiguation)
Maximisation (disambiguation)
 Magnification
 Plateau's problem